Carl Johan "Massa" Lind (25 May 1883 – 2 February 1965) was a Swedish athlete who competed at the 1912, 1920, 1924 and 1928 Summer Olympics, missing the 1916 Games that were cancelled due to World War I.

In 1912 he finished fifth in the hammer throw competition and eighth in the two handed discus throw event.

At the 1920 Summer Olympics he won a silver medal in the hammer throw and a bronze medal in the 56 lb weight throw, both times behind Patrick Ryan. At the 1924 and 1928 Games he competed only in hammer throw and finished 7th and 14th, respectively.

Lind won 17 Swedish titles: in the hammer throw (1918–1924), weight throw (1918–19, 1921–1927) and discus throw (1910); he was also a four-time British AAA Champion in the hammer throw (1913–14, 1921, 1927). In 1912 Lind set a national hammer throw record that stood for 15 years. Lind worked as a policeman in Karlstad and continued competing until the age of 50.

References

1883 births
1965 deaths
Swedish male hammer throwers
Olympic athletes of Sweden
Athletes (track and field) at the 1912 Summer Olympics
Athletes (track and field) at the 1920 Summer Olympics
Athletes (track and field) at the 1924 Summer Olympics
Athletes (track and field) at the 1928 Summer Olympics
Olympic silver medalists for Sweden
Olympic bronze medalists for Sweden
Male weight throwers
People from Karlskoga Municipality
Medalists at the 1920 Summer Olympics
Olympic silver medalists in athletics (track and field)
Olympic bronze medalists in athletics (track and field)
Olympic weight throwers
Sportspeople from Örebro County